Industrieverband Fahrzeugbau ("Industrial Association for Vehicle Construction"), usually abbreviated as IFA, was a conglomerate and a union of companies for vehicle construction in the former East Germany.

IFA produced bicycles, motorcycles, light commercial vehicles, automobiles, vans and heavy trucks. All East German vehicle manufacturers were part of the IFA, including Barkas, EMW (which made Wartburg cars), IWL, MZ, Multicar, Robur, Sachsenring (which made Trabant cars) and Simson.

Car production
IFA cars were based on pre-war DKW designs and made in the former Horch factory in Zwickau. The F8 had a two-cylinder  engine, and the F9 had a three-cylinder  unit. The F8 bodies were straight copies of the pre-war models, and rapidly looked old-fashioned, but some had more modern coachwork by Baur of Stuttgart, then in West Germany. The three cylinder cars (F9) had not got into production before war broke out in 1939, and so had more up to date bodies similar to the West German DKWs. More than 26,000 F8's and 30,000 F9s were built. IWL produced W50 and L60 trucks and Robur light trucks and vans.

The IFA badge was dropped from cars in 1956, and the F8s became Zwickau P70s, and the F9 was rebodied to become the Wartburg and production transferred to Eisenach.

Vehicle gallery

Two wheels

Cars

Transporter & trucks

External links 

UK-based official Wartburg, Trabant and IFA owners' club

 
Defunct truck manufacturers
Defunct bus manufacturers
Emergency services equipment makers
Motorcycle manufacturers of Germany
Cycle manufacturers of Germany
Car manufacturers of East Germany
Bus manufacturers of Germany